Penion sulcatus is a species of medium-to-large predatory marine snail or whelk, commonly called the northern siphon whelk or kākara nui in Māori, belonging to the true whelk family Buccinidae.

Description
Penion sulcatus is a medium-to-large species of Penion siphon whelk. Shells are highly variable in sculpture and colouration, but shells are often dark with a white aperture.

The extinct species Penion exoptatus, Penion clifdenensis, and potentially also Penion marwicki, may belong to the same evolutionary lineage as the extant species Penion sulcatus. This hypothesis is based on geometric morphometric analysis of shell shape and size for all four taxa, as well as the analysis of morphometric variation exhibited all living species of Penion.

Distribution
Penion sulcatus is endemic to New Zealand. The species is found of the entire North Island and northern South Island coasts. The species has an abundant fossil record in the North Island of New Zealand.

P. sulcatus is benthic and is common on soft-sediments on the continental shelf  or within the subtidal rocky shore environment.

Ecology

Penion sulcatus is a carnivore and is known to feed on mussels and Dosina zelandica zelandica.

Human use
Shells found in middens of historic Māori settlements indicate that P. sulcatus may have been intentionally foraged as a food-source.

References

External links
 Museum of New Zealand Te Papa Tongarewa, Taxon: Penion sulcatus Lamarck, 1816 (Species)
 Revised descriptions of New Zealand Cenozoic Mollusca from Beu and Maxwell (1990): Penion sulcatus (Lamarck, 1816)
 Massey University NZ Fauna Scanned 3D model of Penion sulcatus
 Natural History Museum Rotterdam - Mollusca - Gastropoda - Buccinidae

Buccinidae
Gastropods of New Zealand
Taxa named by Jean-Baptiste Lamarck
Gastropods described in 1816